TOS-Actief is a Dutch football club based in Amsterdam, North Holland. TOS was founded in 1912 and merged with Actief (which was founded in 1920) in 1939, it now has over 500 members. Marciano Vink was a member of TOS-Actief.

History

TOS 
TOS (Ter Overwinning Streven) was founded on 10 October in the basement of a store on the Langeleidsedwarsstraat, by a few guys from across Amsterdam. They arranged a pitch but it was hard to reach in the suburbs of Amsterdam. TOS could only use this pitch in the weekends so every Friday they had to redraw the lines with lime on their bare hands and had to bring the goalposts. After some years TOS got a pitch on the Middenweg 89 and joined the Amsterdamse Voetbalbond. TOS played in the Tweede divisie and won the championship in 1920, because TOS won the championship a lot of the players transferred to bigger clubs.

Actief 
Actief (Active) was founded on 6 September 1920 by some boys from the Von Zesenstraat. Mr. Dogger, now honorary member of TOS-actief, was prepared to do most of the jobs needed to run the club (e.g. Chairman and paymaster). Actief found a pitch on a sand terrain in the Indische Buurt, and joined the Dutch Christian Football Association. After one season Actief joined the Amsterdamse Volks Voetbalbond with two squads, and in 1923 Actief joined Amsterdamse Voetbalbond with three professional squads. In 1938 Actief won the championship, and almost the entire squad and even players from lower squads left Actief.

TOS-Actief 
Because TOS and Actief had harsh time with decreasing members, they decided to merge in 1939 to the club TOS-Actief (Ter Overwinning Streven Actief).  In World War II the Germans took the terrain, after World War II the area was a big mess all remaining members of TOS-actief helped moving all the debris from the pitch and built a wooden pavilion, in 1963 they rebuilt it to a stone pavilion. In 1976 Amsterdam wanted to build a highway over the TOS-Actief area, TOS-Actief had to move to Sportpark De Toekomst. TOS-Actief played football there for 20 years. In 1996 Amsterdam and Ajax planned to build the Amsterdam Arena and Ajax wanted to house its Jong Ajax on Sportpark De Toekomst so TOS-Actief had to move again. TOS-Actief moved to Radioweg 63 on sportpark Middenmeer where TOS-Actief now has 4 pitches.

References 

Football clubs in Amsterdam
Association football clubs established in 1912
Football clubs in the Netherlands
1912 establishments in the Netherlands